The 16th Annual Helpmann Awards for live performance in Australia were held on 25 July 2016 at the Sydney Lyric Theatre.

The Australian production of Matilda the Musical received thirteen awards including every award for musicals. Griffin Theatre Company's drama The Bleeding Tree received three awards including Best Play. Brisbane Baroque's production of Handel's Agrippina received four awards including Best Opera, and Bangarra Dance Theatre's Sheoak received three awards including Best Ballet or Dance Work. New musical Ladies in Black was named Best New Australian Work.

Winners and nominees
In the following tables, winners are listed first and highlighted in boldface. The nominees are listed below the winner and not in boldface.

Theatre

Musicals

Opera and classical music

Dance and physical theatre

Contemporary music

Other

Industry

Lifetime achievement

References

External links

Helpmann Awards
Helpmann Awards
Helpmann Awards
Helpmann Awards
Helpmann Awards, 16th
Helpmann Awards